Urosalpinx subrusticus is an extinct species of sea snail, a marine gastropod mollusk in the family Muricidae, the murex snails or rock snails.

Description
The length of the shell attains 33 mm.

Distribution
Fossils were found in Miocene strata of Maryland, USA (age range: 20.43 to 7.246 Ma)

References

L. W. Ward. 1998. Mollusks from the Lower Miocene Pollack Farm Site, Kenty County, Delaware: A preliminary analysis. Geology and paleontology of the lower Miocene Pollack Farm Fossil Site, Delaware

External links
 WMSDB: Urosalpinx subrusticus

subrusticus
Miocene gastropods
Gastropods described in 1852